SS Tynwald may refer to:

, served with the Isle of Man Steam Packet Company from 1846 to 1866
, served with the Isle of Man Steam Packet Company from 1866 to 1888
, served with the Isle of Man Steam Packet Company from 1891 to 1934
RMS Tynwald (1936), served with the Isle of Man Steam Packet Company from 1936 to 1939; requisitioned by the Royal Navy in 1939 and sunk in 1942
TSS Tynwald (1947), served with the Isle of Man Steam Packet Company from 1947 to 1974
 (IOMSPCo. 1986–1990) ex-Antrim Princess; previous Manx service with Sealink

Ship names